The Las Cruces bowling alley massacre occurred in Las Cruces, New Mexico, United States, on February 10, 1990. Seven people were shot, four fatally, by two unidentified robbers at the Las Cruces Bowling Alley at 1201 East Amador Avenue. The gunmen shot the victims in an office, then set fire to a desk in the room and left the scene. The case is unsolved.

Shooting
On the morning of February 10, 1990, the bowling alley's manager, 34-year-old Stephanie C. Senac, was in her office preparing to open the business with her 12-year-old daughter Melissa Repass and Melissa's 13-year-old friend Amy Houser, who were planning to supervise the alley's day care. The alley's cook, Ida Holguin, was in the kitchen when two men entered through an unlocked door. One pulled a .22 caliber pistol on Holguin and ordered her into Senac's office, where she, Repass, and Houser were already being held by the other gunman.

The gunmen ordered the women and children to lie down while taking approximately $4,000 to $5,000 from the bowling alley's safe. Soon after, Steve Teran, the alley's 26-year-old pin mechanic, entered. As Teran had been unable to find a babysitter for his two daughters—two-year-old Valerie Teran and six-year-old Paula Holguin (no relation to Ida)—he intended to drop them off at the alley's day care. Not seeing anyone in the alley, Teran entered Senac's office and stumbled onto the crime scene. The gunmen then shot all seven victims multiple times at point-blank range. They then set the office on fire by igniting some papers before leaving the alley.

The bowling alley fire was reported at 8:33am. Officers responding to the call discovered that Amy Houser, Paula Holguin, and Steven Teran had died at the scene. Valerie Teran was rushed to a hospital, but declared dead on arrival. Repass, despite being shot five times, called 9-1-1 on the office phone, allowing emergency services to respond immediately and saving her life along with her mother's and Ida Holguin's. However, Senac died in 1999 due to complications from her injuries.

Police set up ten roadblocks surrounding Las Cruces within an hour of the shooting, and carefully screened anyone leaving the city. The U.S. Customs Service, Army and Border Patrol searched the area with planes and helicopters, but no arrests were made.

Investigation 
The case remains unsolved, but is still under active investigation by the Las Cruces Police Department .

In 2016, 26 years after the shooting, a brother of victim Steven Teran (who died in the shooting), Anthony Teran, was included in an issue of the Las Cruces Sun-News newspaper and one of his remarks was noted, "In this day and age, things like this don’t go unsolved. How did we not get these guys? That’s the question I ask myself every day. Numerous people saw these gunmen, so someone out there knows something, and they need to come forward."

Authorities are now trying to build a DNA profile from evidence found at the scene.

In popular culture

Movies
A full-length documentary film called A Nightmare in Las Cruces was released on the 20th anniversary of the massacre. It uses actual crime scene video, pictures and interviews with family members. Filmmaker Charlie Minn hopes it will "move someone to come forward with fresh information and break the case." Since its release, more tips have been reported to the local police.

TV crime informational series 
This case was featured on Unsolved Mysteries two and a half months after the murders, and on America's Most Wanted twice, once in November 2004 and again in March 2010.

See also

 List of events called massacres
 List of massacres in the United States
 List of unsolved murders (1980–1999)
 1991 Austin yogurt shop murders – a similar crime that remains unsolved
 Delisle triple murder – a solved triple murder near Las Cruces

References

External links
 IMDb A Nightmare in Las Cruces (2011)
 A Nightmare in Las Cruces (2011)

Las Cruces, New Mexico
Unsolved mass murders in the United States
Mass shootings in New Mexico
Massacres in the United States
Murder in New Mexico
1990 in New Mexico
1990 murders in the United States
Massacres in 1990
February 1990 events in the United States
February 1990 crimes
1990 mass shootings in the United States
Mass shootings in the United States